This is a comprehensive list of volunteer computing projects; a type of distributed computing where volunteers donate computing time to specific causes. The donated computing power comes from idle CPUs and GPUs in personal computers, video game consoles and Android devices.

Each project seeks to utilize the computing power of many internet connected devices to solve problems and perform tedious, repetitive research in a very cost effective manner.

Active projects

Completed projects

See also

 List of grid computing projects
 List of citizen science projects
 List of crowdsourcing projects
 List of free and open-source Android applications
 List of Berkeley Open Infrastructure for Network Computing (BOINC) projects

References 

Volunteer computing
Science in society
Science-related lists
Computing-related lists